Michael S. Piazza is a prolific spiritual author and social justice advocate who currently serves as pastor of Broadway United Church of Christ in New York City. Previously, he was interim pastor of First Presbyterian Church in New Canaan, CT. Before that, he served as senior pastor of Virginia Highland Church, a congregation dually affiliated with the Alliance of Baptists and the United Church of Christ.

Piazza is best known as the former senior pastor and dean of the Cathedral of Hope in Dallas, Texas, which, under his leadership, grew from approximately 350 members to more than 3,500.

A native of the U.S. state of Georgia, Piazza has served in ministry for more than three decades as pastor of churches in Georgia, Texas, Oklahoma, and Florida. He holds a bachelor's degree in History from Valdosta State University in Georgia and a Master of Divinity from the Candler School of Theology, Emory University, in Atlanta. His doctoral degree is from Hartford Seminary where he is an adjunct professor of Congregational Renewal.  He is the President of Agile Church Consulting and has worked with dozens of churches around the country.

In August 1999, The Advocate magazine named Piazza one of the most influential people in the gay and lesbian rights movement and he was honored by Pacific School of Religion with its "Leading Voice" award for his social justice work on behalf of lesbian, gay, bisexual, and transgender people. His published books include "Liberating the Gospel"; "Liberating Word, A Daily Reflection for Liberals, Volume One: The First Testament"; "Gay by God: How to be Lesbian or Gay and Christian" (formerly "Holy Homosexuals"); "Queeries: Questions Lesbians and Gays have for God"; "The Real antiChrist: How America Sold its Soul"; "Prophetic Renewal: Hope for the Liberal Church," designed to help restore vitality to liberal congregations; and "Liberating Hope: Daring to Renew the Mainline Church" co-written with the Rev. Cameron Trimble; "Vital Vintage Church"; and "Fishing in a Shallow Sea."

Piazza and his partner Bill Eure were together since 1980 and have two daughters. Eure died in July 2016.
Piazza and his assistant David Plunkett are dedicated to introducing audiovisual ministry to as many congregations as possible.

References

8. www.broadwayucc.org
9. www.agilechurch.com

External links
 Cathedral of Hope
 Hope for Peace and Justice
 Center for Progressive Renewal
 

American LGBT rights activists
Living people
American gay writers
Writers from Georgia (U.S. state)
American spiritual writers
Year of birth missing (living people)